The Wyolah Plantation is a historic Southern plantation in Church Hill, Jefferson County, Mississippi. It is located off the Mississippi Highway 553.

Overview
The Wyolah Plantation owner's house was built for Dr. Francis B. Coleman before the Civil War. The architectural style of the plantation house is Greek Revival. It is thought that maybe Coleman named Wyolah after a place in Ireland. Coleman owned 81 enslaved people in Jefferson County, Mississippi in the 1860 census.

Coleman had a medical practice in Rodney, Mississippi and at his nearby Wyolah Plantation. In the WPA Slave Narrative Collection for the state of Arkansas, former Jefferson County, Mississippi slave Peter Brown told of a time when he was a slave on David Hunt's Woodlawn Plantation and Coleman came to care for his parents, who had contracted cholera. In 1846 Doctor Coleman went to Mount Locust Plantation in Jefferson County to vaccinate some enslaved people.

Coleman and his friend Thomas Affleck published a horticulture-related journal from Wyolah Plantation.

Wyolah was purchased by the Reddy family, and later by the Thomas O'Quinn, Jr. family. In 1984 Wyolah was owned by Dr. James W. and Juel F. Delasho and consisted of 110.44 acres, of which 60.44 acres was nominated as a historic site. It has been listed on the National Register of Historic Places since May 30, 1985.

, producer Tate Taylor is the owner of Wyolah.

References

External links
 

Houses on the National Register of Historic Places in Mississippi
Houses in Jefferson County, Mississippi
Greek Revival houses in Mississippi
Plantation houses in Mississippi
National Register of Historic Places in Jefferson County, Mississippi